Mario Gaetano Gioffredo, also called the Neapolitan Vitruvius (14 May 1718 – 8 March 1785), was an Italian architect, engineer, and engraver.

Biography
He was born and died in Naples. He trained under Martino Buonocore. He was active in a Neoclassical style. He designed the Palazzo Partanna in Naples. He also worked in designs for the Teatrino of the Palazzo d'Afflitto (1748); the design of the Palazzo Latilla (1754), and  the Palazzo Cavalcanti (1762). He designed the church of Spirito Santo (1774), and the monasteries of Maria Maddalena and Santa Caterina da Siena.

He wrote a treatise of architecture (1768). In 1783, he was named the Royal architect to the Neapolitan Court, but had become blind.

References

1718 births
1785 deaths
18th-century Italian architects
Architects from Naples
Italian neoclassical architects
Engineers from Naples
Italian topographers